Bujor Hălmageanu (14 February 1941 – 23 November 2018) was a Romanian retired association football defender and manager.  He competed for his country at the 1964 Tokyo Olympics, where Romania reached the quarter-finals.

Honours
Steaua București
Romanian League: 1967–68
Romanian Cup: 1961–62, 1965–66, 1966–67, 1968–69, 1969–70, 1970–71

Notes

References

External links

1941 births
2018 deaths
Romanian footballers
Romania international footballers
Olympic footballers of Romania
Footballers at the 1964 Summer Olympics
Liga I players
Liga II players
FC Steaua București players
FC Politehnica Timișoara players
FC Petrolul Ploiești players
FC Steaua București managers
ASA Târgu Mureș (1962) players
Association football defenders
Romanian football managers
AFC Dacia Unirea Brăila managers
Sportspeople from Timișoara